Wenchang (postal: Mencheong) is a county-level city in the northeast of Hainan province, China. Although called a "city", Wenchang refers to a large land area in Hainan - an area which was once a county. The urban center and the seat of government of Wenchang is officially known as "Wencheng Town", which is also colloquially referred to as Wenchang City.

History

Wenchang, or in local Hainanese dialect as Boon Siou, is the source of most overseas Hainanese migrants, with the majority of Thailand, Vietnam, Malaysia, Singapore, UK, Australia, USA, Canada & Europe  Hainanese population having ancestral roots in Boon Siou / Wen Chang.  The Wenchang dialect is considered the prestige form of the Hainanese language and is used by the island's provincial broadcasting media.

It was promoted from a county to a city on November 7, 1995, and had a population of 86,551 in 1999 (estimated 2006: 115,000). Maps in the Republic of China on Taiwan continue to show Wenchang as a county part of its Kwangtung province.

Geography
The east side has a long coastline along the South China Sea while the west borders Dongzhai Harbor, Haikou's Meilan District, Qionghai, and Ding'an County. The land is mostly hilly and contains both forest and agricultural areas. The entire area is populated with  countless towns, farms, and villages.

Wencheng Town

There is a central park and covered market downtown. Also located downtown is  a large, modern campus. A new hospital is under construction on the outskirts.

The centre of the town is at near sea level with a canal running between one of the main streets and Wennan Old Street. This area has been subject severe flooding a number of times in the past. Another main road runs from the centre, uphill to the south. This road leads to Yilong Bay. Directly to the north of the town centre lies a fairly affluent hilltop community occupied by numerous housing compounds for retired military and other government workers.

Auto-rickshaws and motorbikes provide the taxi service in the town. There are no car taxis.

Wennan Old Street
Wennan Old Street is a visitor attraction located in the heart of the town. The street is lined with fully restored tong lau buildings similar to those in Haikou's Bo'ai Road area (now being restored) as well as the old street in Puqian (unrestored and dilapidated).

Other towns
 Baoluo
 Changsa
 Chongxing
 Dongge

 Dongjiao - literally "east suburb" and known as "coconut town", is located east of Wencheng Town over the Qinglan Bridge. This town is coastal, and is forested mainly with coconut trees. Small industries for processing coconut products exist there.
 Donglu
 Fengpo
 Huiwen
 Jinshan
 Longlou
 Penglai
 Puqian - a coastal town located in the northern part of Wenchang situated on the eastern shore of Dongzhai Harbor
 Tanniu
 Wengtian - a coastal town located in the northeast of Wenchang, 53 kilometres away from Wencheng Town. There are two ports: Baohu Port and Hulu Port.
 Wenjiao

Culture

Wenchang Chicken originates from this city.

Points of interest
Wenchang is the ancestral home of the Soong sisters: Soong Ching-ling, Soong Ai-ling, Soong Mei-ling and the birthplace of their father Charlie Soong.

Mulantou Lighthouse - located at the northernmost point of Wenchang, this is the fifth tallest lighthouse in the world.
Qinglan Harbour
Temple of Confucius

Spaceport

The Wenchang Satellite Launch Center is located in Wenchang. This is China's fourth and southernmost space vehicle launch facility and because of its low latitude, the Wenchang Satellite Launch Center has been selected to launch China's space station. On 22 September 2007, CCTV officially announced the construction of an expanded Wenchang Satellite Launch Center has been approved by the State Council and the Central Military Commission of the People's Republic of China after decades of postponement due to political concerns.

Education
 Hainan College of Foreign Studies

Notable people

Artists
 Aw Tee Hong (歐世鴻) - Singaporean painter and sculptor.
 Ho Ho Ying (何和應) - Singaporean abstract artist.

Business 

 Charlie Soong (宋嘉樹) - Chinese businessman

Eunuchs
 Wu Rui: a young Chinese man castrated and enslaved as a eunuch in Lê dynasty Annam (Vietnam).

Climate

References

External links 

 Official website of Wenchang government

Cities in Hainan
County-level divisions of Hainan